Ammar Al-Najjar (born 24 February 1997) is a Saudi Arabian footballer who plays for Pro League side Damac.

Career
Al-Najjar started his career at the youth teams of Al-Ittihad. He made his debut on 11 February 2017 in the league match against Al-Taawoun. On 10 March 2017, Al-Najjar started the Crown Prince Cup final against Al-Nassr as Al-Ittihad won the match 1–0 to win their eighth title. He scored his first goal for the club on 14 April 2017 against Al-Qadsiah. On 5 May 2017, Al-Najjar was called for the national team training camp that took place in Riyadh and lasted a week. On 12 May 2018, Al-Najjar came off the bench in the 79th minute in the King Cup final against Al-Faisaly. Al-Ittihad won the match 2–1 to win their ninth King Cup title. On 18 January 2019, Al-Najjar joined Al-Fateh on loan until the end of the season.

On 13 July 2019, Al-Najjar joined Abha on a free transfer after he was released by Al-Ittihad. He made his debut in the 4–2 away loss against Al-Hilal. On 30 August 2019, Al-Najjar scored his first goal for Abha against Al-Wehda in the 2–1 win. He scored the second goal in the 90th minute from a long-range shot. On 14 August 2021, Al-Najjar joined Damac on loan from Al-Shabab.

Career statistics

Club

Honours

Al-Ittihad
King Cup: 2018
Crown Prince Cup: 2016–17

References

External links
 

Living people
1997 births
Sportspeople from Jeddah
Saudi Arabian footballers
Association football wingers
Ittihad FC players
Al-Fateh SC players
Abha Club players
Al-Shabab FC (Riyadh) players
Damac FC players
Saudi Professional League players